The Maitland River is a river in Huron County, Perth County and Wellington County in Southwestern Ontario, Canada. The river is in the Great Lakes Basin and empties into Lake Huron at the town of Goderich. It was formerly known as the Menesetung River.

Course
The river begins in geographic Arthur Township in the municipality of Wellington North, Wellington County. It flows west into the municipality of Minto and its main centre, the community of Harriston, with its triple junction of Ontario Highway 9, Ontario Highway 23 and Ontario Highway 89. The river continues west into the municipality of Howick, Huron County, where it passes over two small dams, at Gorrie (maintained by the Maitland Valley Conservation Authority) and at Wroxeter (maintained by the community), passes through the municipality of Morris-Turnberry, and reaches the community of Wingham in the municipality of North Huron, where it passes over a dam and takes in the left tributary Middle Maitland River. The river then turns southwest and enters the municipality of Ashfield–Colborne–Wawanosh. From the community of Auburn to Goderich, the river forms the boundary between Ashfield–Colborne–Wawanosh and the municipality of Central Huron. The river continues southwest, takes in the left tributary South Maitland River, turns northwest, and reaches its mouth at Lake Huron at the town of Goderich.

Black hole
Near the end of black hole road, east of Goderich there is a "black hole" in the river. It has caused drownings in the past and the depth is approximately six metres as found by sonar.

Natural history

The lower Maitland (to Wingham) has a trout and salmon run, and is home to several species at risk including queen snake, wavy-rayed lampmussel and butternut tree, as well as several Carolinian forest species, including bitternut hickory, American sycamore, summer grape and green dragon.

Tributaries
Cemetery Creek (left)
Sharpes Creek (right)
Hopkins Creek (left)
South Maitland River (left)
Blyth Brook (left)
Belgrave Creek (left)
Middle Maitland River (left)
Little Maitland River
Lakelet Creek (right)
Salem Creek (right)

See also
List of rivers of Ontario

References

Sources

External links
Maitland Valley Conservation Authority

Rivers of Huron County, Ontario
Rivers of Perth County, Ontario
Rivers of Wellington County, Ontario
Tributaries of Lake Huron